The Tranvía del Este, also known as the Puerto Madero Tramway, was a 12-block "demonstration" light rail line in the Puerto Madero neighborhood of Buenos Aires, Argentina, in operation from 2007 to 2012.

After its initial demonstration status, numerous plans were put forward to extend the line and increase ridership, while incorporating it into the Buenos Aires Underground; however, none came to fruition.  it is planned to dismantle the line and move its infrastructure to other areas.

History

With construction of the first section completed, the line was inaugurated on July 14, 2007. Initially, the service was provided by two Alstom Citadis 302 model vehicles, manufactured by the French company Alstom, built for the Mulhouse tramway, in France, and temporarily loaned to Buenos Aires. Carrying Mulhouse numbers 04 and 05, the vehicles were double-ended, bi-directional, low-floor, four-section units, each section having 48 fixed seats, another 16 folding seats and standing room for a total of 300 passengers for the whole car. The vehicles, locally known by the name Celeris, ran on an exclusive right-of-way for  parallel to Avenida Alicia Moreau de Justo, from Avenida Córdoba to Avenida Independencia.

After Mulhouse requested the return of the two trams it loaned, those cars left Buenos Aires in 2008.  Replacing them on the Tranvía del Este was another tram of the same type, but loaned from Madrid, Spain, where it was number 153 (a number it also used in Buenos Aires) in the fleet of the Metro Ligero de Madrid light rail system.

The Mulhouse and Madrid trams both wore the paint schemes of their home systems while in Buenos Aires.

Trams ran from Monday through Saturday from 8:00 until 23:20, and on Sundays and holidays from 9:00 until 22:00, every 15 minutes. For tickets there were two Ticket Vending Machines (TVMs) installed at each station and guards with portable vending machines were also available. Tickets cost ARS 1.00 (around US$0.26).

Extensions were planned, of 2 km to Retiro railway station and the Intercity Bus Terminal and of 5.2 km from the then-existing terminus at Independencia to Caminito in La Boca. However, the extension plans did not proceed.

Closure

By 2012, the scheduled headway was 40 minutes, using one car, and ridership on the line declined to a very low level. In October 2012, the line's only tramcar broke down, and service consequently had to be suspended indefinitely. It was decided to close the line, and 10 October 2012 was the last day of service.

In January 2013, the Government of Argentina transferred the Buenos Aires Underground lines to the Government of Buenos Aires autonomous city, including the Tranvía del Este among its services. In May 2013, the defective car still remained, abandoned, at Independencia station. After the transfer, the extension and expansion of the line was considered but it was not carried out.

The proposal made by State-owned company "Subterráneos de Buenos Aires" (SBASE) consisted of a series of improvements to the service that included the extension of the line to Retiro complex (connecting it with the three railway terminals and the homonymous Underground stations). The project also included the construction of a second track and the purchase of eight trains (at a cost of US$2 million).

Nevertheless, in July 2016, the Chief of Government of Buenos Aires, Horacio Rodriguez Larreta, announced that the disused Tranvía del Este tracks would be lifted, and its components would be transferred to the Premetro, including its rolling stock (one tram), overhead lines and traffic signals. The reason given for dismantling of the line (along with freight tracks in its vicinity) was that its existence conflicted with a regeneration program over the line's entire trajectory, which would turn the right-of-way into parks as well as a partly-underground motorway for buses and heavy goods vehicles travelling between the north and south of the city.

Aftermath
In July 2017, the stations began to be demolished to build the "Paseo del Bajo", a 7-km length dual carriageway that will connect the Presidente Illia and Buenos Aires–La Plata highways. Only heavy vehicles will be allowed to run on Paseo del Bajo.

Gallery

See also

Trams in Buenos Aires
PreMetro E2 (Buenos Aires) - Light rail line in southern part of Buenos Aires
Buenos Aires Underground

References

Light rail in Argentina
Tram transport in Argentina
Public transport in Argentina
Railway lines opened in 2007
Railway lines closed in 2012
b
Buenos Aires Underground
Railway lines in Argentina
Rail transport in Buenos Aires